A stag is an adult male deer.

Stag, Stags or STAG may also refer to:

Arts and entertainment
Stag (Amy Ray album) (2001)
Stag (Melvins album) (1996)
Danny Stag, stage name of American hard rock guitarist Daniel Steigerwald
Stag (film), a 1997 film starring John Stockwell
The Stag (film), a 2013 Irish film
Stag (miniseries), a 2016 television series
Special Tactical Anti-Gang, a unit in the video game Saints Row: The Third
 STAG, an American reality TV show

Sports
The Stags or Mansfield Town F.C., an English football club
Hemel Stags, an English rugby league club
Chicago Stags, a National Basketball Association team from 1946 to 1950
Michigan Stags, a World Hockey Association team in the 1974-1975 season
Fairfield Stags, the athletics programs of Fairfield University, Connecticut, United States
Belleville Stags, (1947–1949), a Class D minor league baseball team based in Belleville, Illinois
Central Stags or Central Districts cricket team, a New Zealand first class cricket team
San Sebastian Stags, the basketball team of San Sebastian College – Recoletos of Manila

Transportation
, various Royal Navy ships
, a World War II water distilling ship
Stag (barque), a Nova Scotian clipper ship, built in 1854
Triumph Stag, a British car
South Devon Railway Leopard class, a 4-4-0ST steam locomotive

Places
Stag Island, Ontario, Canada
Stag Island (Nunavut), Canada
Houvenkopf Mountain, also known as Stag Hill, New Jersey, United States

Other uses
 Stag or bachelor party, held for a man who is soon to be married
 Stag (magazine), various American men's magazines
 The Stag (magazine), a monthly student magazine of the University of Surrey
 South Trafford Archaeological Group, in the UK
 St Albans Girls' School, England
 St Andrew the Great, a Church of England parish church in central Cambridge, England
 Stag Arms, a firearms manufacturer in New Britain, Connecticut
 Stag Beer, a brand of beer

See also
Stag beetle, an insect with "stag horns"
Stag film, a pornographic movie
Stag hunt, in game theory
Stag-moose, an extinct species
Stag PDX, a nightclub and strip club in Portland, Oregon

Stagg (disambiguation)